Musa Hajdari (born 11 October 1987) is a Kosovan middle-distance track athlete who specializes in the 800 meters. He represented Kosovo at the 2015 World Championships in Athletics. He holds multiple Kosovan records.

Running career
On June 1, 2013, Hajdari made his first major international debut at the Yilmaz Sazak Memorial track meet in Istanbul, where he won the men's mile in 4:17.73. On May 1, 2015, Hajdari placed second overall behind Dušan Babić in the men's 1500 meters at the International Meeting in Bar, Montenegro.

Competition record

References

External links
 

1987 births
Living people
Kosovo Albanians
Kosovan male middle-distance runners
World Athletics Championships athletes for Kosovo
Athletes (track and field) at the 2016 Summer Olympics
Olympic athletes of Kosovo
Athletes (track and field) at the 2018 Mediterranean Games
Mediterranean Games competitors for Kosovo
People from Kamenica, Kosovo
Athletes (track and field) at the 2020 Summer Olympics